The Gyeongin Expressway, officially Expressway No. 120, is an expressway in South Korea connecting the Yangcheon District of Seoul to the Nam District of Incheon. It is the oldest expressway in South Korea.

Construction began March 24, 1967. The initial segment between Gajwa in the Seo District of Incheon and Yangpyeong-dong in the Yeongdeungpo District of Seoul opened on December 21, 1968. In 1985, the easternmost segment between Yangpyeong and the Shinwol Interchange was transferred to Seoul, making Shinwol in the Yancheong District the new terminus.

It was assigned route number 2 in 1983. In 2001, South Korea re-rationalized its expressway numbering system, and it was redesignated route 120.

History 
 24 March 1967: Construction begins
 21 December 1968: Yangpyeongdong~Gajwa segment open to traffic.
 21 July 1969: Gajwa~Incheon Port segment open to traffic.
 12 November 1985: Korea National Expressway Corporation passes control of the northernmost 5 km stretch of expressway (between Sinwol and Yangpyeong-dong) to the City of Seoul.

Compositions

Lanes 
 Incheon~W.Incheon IC: 6
 W.Incheon~Seoul: 8

Length 
 24 km

Limited Speed 
 100 km/h

List of facilities 

IC: Interchange, JC: Junction, SA: Service Area, TG:Tollgate

Gallery

See also 
 Roads and expressways in South Korea
 Transportation in South Korea

External links 
 MOLIT South Korean Government Transport Department

Expressways in South Korea
Roads in Incheon
Roads in Gyeonggi
Roads in Seoul